Khuwabzaadi is a Pakistani TV drama, written by Samina Nazeer, and produced and directed by Barkat Sidiki. It originally aired on TV One Pakistan.

Cast 
Almas Fidai
Shahzad Noor
Alizay Rasool
Gul-e-Rana
Tanveer Jamal
Rashid Farooqui
Javed Jamal
Tehreem Zuberi
Zaheen Tahira
Fareeda Shabbir as Khalil's mother
Zia Gurchani
Komal Iqbal

References

Pakistani drama television series
2018 Pakistani television series debuts
2017 Pakistani television series endings
2018 Pakistani television series endings
Urdu-language television shows
TVOne Pakistan